Tanacetum parthenium, known as feverfew, is a flowering plant in the daisy family, Asteraceae. It may be grown as an ornament, and may be identified by its synonyms, Chrysanthemum parthenium and Pyrethrum parthenium.

Description
The leaves are light yellowish green, variously pinnatifid. The outer, ray florets have white ligules and the inner, disc florets are yellow and tubular. It spreads rapidly by seed, and will cover a wide area after a few years.

Distribution and cultivation

Feverfew is native to Eurasia, specifically the Balkan Peninsula, Anatolia, and the Caucasus, but cultivation has spread it around the world and the rest of Europe, North America, and Chile.

It is hardy to USDA zone 5. Outside of its native range, it may become an invasive weed.

Uses

Traditional medicine
In traditional medicine, feverfew has been used to treat headache, but there is no confirmed scientific evidence that it has such an effect. Feverfew contains parthenolide, which is under basic research to assess its properties on cancer. Feverfew is registered as a traditional herbal medicine in the Nordic countries under the brand name Glitinum. Only powdered feverfew is approved in the European Union herbal monograph.

Dietary supplement
The parthenolide content of commercially available feverfew supplements varies substantially (by more than 40-fold) despite labeling claims of "standardization".

Adverse effects
Long-term use of feverfew followed by abrupt discontinuation may induce a withdrawal syndrome featuring rebound headaches and muscle and joint pains. Feverfew may cause allergic reactions, including contact dermatitis. Other side effects have included gastrointestinal upset such as nausea, vomiting, abdominal pain, diarrhea, and flatulence. When the herb is chewed or taken orally it may cause mouth ulcers and swelling and numbness of the mouth. Feverfew should not be taken by pregnant women. It may interact with blood thinners and increase the risk of bleeding, and also may interact with a variety of medications metabolized by the liver.

History and etymology
The word "feverfew" derives from the Latin word febrifugia, meaning "fever reducer," although it no longer is considered useful for that purpose.

Although its earliest medicinal use is unknown, it was documented in the first century (CE) as an anti-inflammatory by the Greek herbalist physician, Dioscorides.

References

Further reading

External links 

 Feverfew information from the National Center for Complementary and Integrative Health
Feverfew in A Modern Herbal
 
 

Medicinal plants of Asia
parthenium
Herbs
Medicinal plants of Europe